is an entry in the Super Sentai VS film series, which features the meeting of casts and characters of Tokumei Sentai Go-Busters and Kaizoku Sentai Gokaiger. The film was released on January 19, 2013. This is the first appearance of the 37th Super Sentai called Zyuden Sentai Kyoryuger.

Plot
At the  Energy Management Center, the Buddyroids question their Go-Buster partners' dependence on them before they are alerted to an attack on the Soujou District. Upon arriving and seeing what looks like a black pirate ship attacking, the Go-Busters before encounter the Space Empire Zangyack's new emperor Bacchus Gil and who they recognize as the Gokaigers. While Buster Hercules deals with the black Gokai Galleon, the Go-Busters fight the Gokaigers before Gokai Silver arrives frantically to intervene. Giving his team the Google V and Timeranger Keys, Gokai Silver is confused over what is going on as Enter arrives with a case holding four Ranger Keys while obtaining a red one to complete what he called phantom Ranger Keys. However, a time vortex opens from the Keys' unstable power, with Enter keeping the red Ranger Key while the rest are sucked in along with the Gokaigers, Yoko, Gorisaki, and Beet J. Stag. Soon after, captured upon arriving, Navi reveals how she and Gai last saw their friends when their attack on the Zangyack home world ended with them being defeated by Bacchus in conjunction with his alliance with the Vaglass.

After Navi reveals the five phantom Ranger Keys grant unlimited power to whoever possesses them, the Go-Busters receive a visit from Kaoru Shiba of the Shinkengers who brings them a scroll from Yoko that reveals she, Jay, and Gai ended up in 18th century Tokyo. Learning that Gokaigers are in different times in Europe and Gorisaki in Laurasia, the Go-Busters learn they can retrieve them by using GouZyu Drill's time travel ability on their Megazords within a 45-minute time limit. As Masato gets the green Ranger Key ahead of Ahim and Doc in England 1805, Blue Buster battles Gokai Blue and Gokai Yellow in 1557 Mediterran for the blue Ranger Key before they suddenly attack Bacchus's subordinate Waredonaier as he takes the blue ranger key. Confronting Captain Marvelous at the Dino Curry in 2005, taking their fight outside, Hiromu learns the Gokaigers sided with the Zangyack after their defeat to bide their time until they get the phantom Ranger Keys. However, Bacchus is on to the deception and steals the green Ranger Key from Masato, Ahim, and Doc once they returned to the present while his forces find the pink Ranger Key. Back in 18th century Tokyo, after they encounter Jerashid and get the yellow Ranger Key from him, Yoko's group are found by the RH-03 after Usada retrieved Gorisaki. However, the RH-03 is attacked by Enter in Megazord Epsilon while Yoko's group is attacked by the Zangyack with their allies coming to their aid. Unfortunately, besides losing the ranger Key to Bacchus, the GoBusters' mecha lack Enetron needed to return to their time before Nick, Gorisaki and Usada offer their energy for the process. Though it succeeds, it resulted with the Buddyroids's anti-Metavirus program being damaged as they are rendered into mindless drones with no way of undoing the damage.

Once alerted of Enter and Bacchus beginning their plan to consume the Earth in subspace over the Tanomori district, the Go-Busters resolve to fight despite losing their partners. Arriving in a past version of the Gokai Galleon to hold off the Black Galleon, the Super Sentai teams confront Enter while defeating the army of Buglers and Zangyack soldiers. Though Bacchus intends to fight, Enter calls in Escape to fight the Sentai teams along with Avatars of Damaras and Basco Ta Jolokia to assist in the fight. After the avatars are defeated, the teams battle Bacchus while Red Buster and Gokai Red retrieve the Phantom Keys. However, the machine powering up the subspace keeps function with destroying the Black Galleon the only course of action left. However, Waredonaier stands in their way before the two red Sentai members are saved by Kyoryu Red who offers to hold off the Zangyack for them. Joined by his teammates, the Zyuden Sentai Kyoryuger team formally introduce themselves before defeating Waredonaier. Despite the Buddyroids' state, the Go-Busters call in their Buster Machines to destroy the Black Galleon with Enter standing in their way in Megazord Omega. Explaining to him that they only fight those who get in their way as Earth's protection entrusted to the Go-Busters, the Gokaigers use red Ranger Keys to overpower Bacchus before defeating him with a Gokai Legend Dream/Gokai Galleon Buster combo. Refusing to give up, Bacchus enlarges with GokaiOh and GouZyuJin formed to fight him.

Though both giant battles are in the villains' favor, the Go-Busters' refusal to abandon their Buddyroids enable them to restore their partners' personalities. As Go-Buster LiOh is formed, the Phantom Keys transform into Buddyroid-like forms that the Gokaigers realize is the Greater Power of the Go-Busters, representing the bond between them and their robotic friends, before the Ranger Keys transform into Megazord Keys. Using them, Go-Buster Ace, GokaiOh, Buster Hercules, Go-Buster LiOh, and GouZyuJin become Geki Tohja, DaiBouken, Magi King, Gao King, and Daizyujin, respectively, to fight not only Bacchus and Megazord Omega, but also the various Megazord models Enter summons. The fight ultimately ends with Bacchus's death and the destruction of both Megazord Omega and the Black Galleon. After the Gokaigers bid farewell to the Go-Busters to find another treasure, Marvelous commenting them to be a worthy Super Sentai team, the Buddyroids end up getting into another argument with their partners over what occurred while they were mindless.

Cast
 Hiromu Sakurada/Red Buster: 
 Ryuji Iwasaki/Blue Buster: 
 Yoko Usami/Yellow Buster: 
 Cheeda Nick: 
 Gorisaki Banana: 
 Usada Lettuce: 
 Masato Jin/Beet Buster: 
 Beet J. Stag/Stag Buster, Waredonaier: 
 Captain Marvelous/Gokai Red: 
 Joe Gibken/Gokai Blue: 
 Luka Millfy/Gokai Yellow: 
 Don "Doc" Dogoier/Gokai Green: 
 Ahim de Famille/Gokai Pink: 
 Gai Ikari/Gokai Silver: 
 Navi: 
 Takeshi Kuroki: 
 Toru Morishita: 
 Miho Nakamura: 
 Kaoru Shiba: 
 Jerashid: 
 Enter: 
 Escape: 
 Basco Ta Jolokia: 
 Bacchus Gill: 
 Kyoryu Red (Daigo Kiryu): 
 Kyoryu Black (Ian Yorkland): 
 Kyoryu Blue (Nobuharu Udo): 
 Kyoryu Green (Souji Rippukan): 
 Kyoryu Pink (Amy Yuuzuki): 
 Automatic Program Voice: 
 Mobilate Voice, Gokai Sabre Voice, Gokai Gun Voice, Gokai Cellular Voice, Gokai Spear Voice, Gokai Galleon Buster Voice: 
 GB Custom Visor Voice, Lio Blaster Voice: 
 Gaburevolver Voice: 
 Narration:

Theme song

Artist:

Reception

Tokumei Sentai Go-Busters vs. Kaizoku Sentai Gokaiger: The Movie earned $4.4 million at the Japanese box office.

References

External links
Official website
Toei website

2013 films
2010s Super Sentai films
Crossover tokusatsu films
Films directed by Takayuki Shibasaki
Films scored by Kousuke Yamashita